Scratch is a 2008 Polish drama film directed by Michał Rosa.

Cast 
 Jadwiga Jankowska-Cieślak - Joanna Kocjan
 Krzysztof Stroiński - Jan Zólwienski
 Ewa Telega - Beata
 Mirosława Marcheluk - Nastka
 Teresa Marczewska - Hanka
 Ryszard Filipski - Marczak
 Stanisław Radwan - Iwo
  - Jacek
 Jerzy Nowak - Leon
 Kinga Preis - Zosia
  - Mrs. Olga

References

External links 

2008 drama films
2008 films
Polish drama films

Films directed by Michal Rosa